Ghilianella mirabilis is a species of true bug found in the Amazon basin.

References

Reduviidae
Insects described in 1925
Fauna of the Amazon